The Nantucket Regional Transit Authority (NRTA) is the public transport authority on the island of Nantucket in Massachusetts, USA. It operates a small network of shuttle buses and paratransit service year-round.

The NRTA's shuttle bus service, The Wave (also referred to as the NRTA Wave), is branded using blue and white colors. Paratransit service is branded as Your Island Ride using red and white livery.

History 
NRTA was created by Massachusetts General Laws Chapter 161B in 1993, but did not begin to operate until 1995, when it had only four buses operating on two routes.

As of April 27, 2018 The Wave began year-round operation. Prior to that date, only Your Island Ride was available year-round.

Services
The Wave operates 10 seasonal scheduled bus routes, which are operated by Valley Transportation Services of Massachusetts (VTS of MA). Buses serve Madaket, Miacomet, Mid-Island, the Airport, and Siasconset. Two additional routes serve Jetties and Surfside beaches under the "Beach Bus" route designation. The NRTA also operates the "Wave Ferry Connector", a free service for ticketed ferry passengers  connecting the Steamship and Hy-Line docks to the town's park and ride lot.

Your Island Ride has been servicing people with disabilities and people aged 60 and older since 2001. The service operates as a door-to-door reservation van.

Fares
The following fares for The Wave are active as of Summer 2020. Your Island Ride is a complimentary service.

For people 65 and older, individuals with disabilities, and veterans and active military personnel, you can pay a half fee.

Children 6 and under ride for free.
Notes
 Free for ticketed ferry customers only, others must pay $1.00.

External links

Official website

1993 establishments in Massachusetts
Bus transportation in Massachusetts
Government agencies established in 1993
State agencies of Massachusetts
Transportation in Nantucket, Massachusetts